Herpetopoma corallinum is a species of sea snail, a marine gastropod mollusk in the family Chilodontidae.

Distribution
This marine species occurs in the Great Barrier Reef.

References

External links
 To World Register of Marine Species

corallinum
Gastropods described in 1994